Saint Mark's Episcopal Church is a historic Episcopal church on Liberty Street in Chelsea, Dutchess County, New York.  It was built in 1866 and is a small rectangular frame church building in the Gothic Revival style.  It has a steeply pitched gable roof, topped by a belfry.  It features a three-part lancet window.

It was added to the National Register of Historic Places in 1987.

References

External links

Episcopal church buildings in New York (state)
Churches on the National Register of Historic Places in New York (state)
Carpenter Gothic church buildings in New York (state)
Churches completed in 1866
19th-century Episcopal church buildings
History museums in New York (state)
Churches in Dutchess County, New York
1866 establishments in New York (state)
National Register of Historic Places in Dutchess County, New York